Marion Jasper Jordan Farm, also known as Jordan Place, is a historic home and farm located near Gulf, Chatham County, North Carolina.  The main house was built about 1893, and is a large two-story Late Victorian / Queen Anne style frame dwelling. It has a two-story rear all.  It features a nearly-full-facade, full-height two-tiered entry porch.  Also on the property are the contributing wellhouse (c. 1900), flower house (c. 1900), blacksmith's shop (c. 1920), and caretaker's cottage (c. 1910).

It was listed on the National Register of Historic Places in 1988.

References

Houses on the National Register of Historic Places in North Carolina
Victorian architecture in North Carolina
Queen Anne architecture in North Carolina
Houses completed in 1893
Houses in Chatham County, North Carolina
National Register of Historic Places in Chatham County, North Carolina
Blacksmith shops